A Test of Love is a 1958 Chinese Yue opera film directed by Huang Zumo and starring Fu Quanxiang, Lu Jinhua, and other performers of the Shanghai Yue Opera House. The script of the film, as well as that of the stage production on which the film is based, was written by Tian Han with his wife An E and based on the Wang Kui Betrays Guiying legend from the Song dynasty.

References

Chinese-language opera films
Films set in the Song dynasty
Chinese black-and-white films
Films set in Shandong
Films set in Kaifeng
1958 films
Films directed by Huang Zumo